Ellen Miles is an American author, the writer of the Puppy Place and Kitty Corner series of children's books.

Early life 
She was born in New York City, on April 8, 1957 and now lives in Vermont.

Career 
Several of her stories have been translated into French and Spanish. She is also the author of the unauthorized Santa Paws series of books under the name Kris Edwards. She has also ghostwritten multiple Baby-Sitters Club books.

See also

References

Living people
1957 births
American women children's writers
American children's writers
20th-century women writers
Writers from New York City
The Baby-Sitters Club